Joseph Arthur Roger Cormier (March 23, 1905 – February 9, 1971) was a Canadian professional ice hockey right winger who played in one National Hockey League game for the Montreal Canadiens during the 1925–26 NHL season.

Career Statistics

See also
List of players who played only one game in the NHL

External links

1905 births
1971 deaths
Canadian ice hockey right wingers
Cleveland Falcons players
Cleveland Indians (IHL) players
Ice hockey people from Montreal
Montreal Canadiens players
Pittsburgh Shamrocks players
Providence Reds players
Rochester Cardinals players
Windsor Bulldogs (1929–1936) players
Canadian expatriate ice hockey players in the United States